The women's long jump at the 2012 World Junior Championships in Athletics was held at the Estadi Olímpic Lluís Companys on 12 and 13 July. The event was won by British heptathlon specialist Katarina Johnson-Thompson.

Medalists

Records
, the existing world junior and championship records were as follows.

Qualification

Qualification: Standard 6.30 m (Q) or at least best 12 qualified (q)

Final

Participation
According to an unofficial count, 31 athletes from 23 countries participated in the event.

References

External links
WJC12 long jump schedule

Long Jump
Long jump at the World Athletics U20 Championships
2012 in women's athletics